Boyish Story is the fifth Korean-language studio album by South Korean girl group Baby V.O.X. It was released on June 4, 2001, by DR Music. The album sold about 100,000 copies in South Korea.

Track listing 
 Intro
 Game Over
 인형 (Dolls)
 내 사랑이기를 (Hope You Were My Love)
 Cut
 Lucky 7
 부디
 가까이
 Come to Me 
 To Angel
 Puzzle
 The One
 Go Go, No No, So So
 마지막 선물
 Game over (Mr)
 Outro

Members during this release 
Kim E-Z
Shim Eun-Jin
Kan Mi-Youn
Yoon Eun-Hye
Lee Hee-Jin

DR Music albums
Baby V.O.X. albums
2001 albums